Fishing Blues is the eighth studio album by American hip hop group Atmosphere. It was released via Rhymesayers Entertainment on August 12, 2016.

Critical reception
At Metacritic, which assigns a weighted average score out of 100 to reviews from mainstream critics, Fishing Blues received an average score of 71% based on 6 reviews, indicating "generally favorable reviews".

Track listing

Charts

References

External links
 

2016 albums
Atmosphere (music group) albums
Rhymesayers Entertainment albums